Body positivity is a social movement focused on the acceptance of all bodies, regardless of size, shape, skin tone, gender, and physical abilities, while challenging present-day beauty standards as an undesirable social construct. Proponents focus on the appreciation of the functionality and health of the human body, instead of its physiological appearance.

Viewpoints 

Body-positive advocates believe that size, like race, gender, sexuality, and physical capability, is one of the many ways that our bodies are placed in a power and desirability hierarchy. In other words, judgments about one's physical appearance inherently place one on a certain rung of a ladder that rates and values one's desirability, effectively increasing or reducing one's power in society. The movement aims to challenge unrealistic ideals of physical attractiveness, build positive body image, and improve self-confidence. A central belief advocated is that beauty is a construct of society and that this construct should not determine one's confidence or self-worth. Individuals are encouraged to love themselves to the fullest while not only accepting but even embracing their physical traits.

Body positivity has roots in the fat acceptance movement as well as the National Association to Advance Fat Acceptance. Body positivity differs from fat acceptance in that it is all encompassing and inclusive of all body types, whereas fat acceptance only advocates for individuals considered to be obese or overweight. The movement argues that neither fat-shaming nor skinny-shaming is acceptable, and that all body types can and should be celebrated.

Although body positivity is perceived as the celebration of one's physical appearance as it is, women are highly motivated to advocate the normalization of body hair, bodily fluids, menstruation, and to challenge preconceived ideas regarding a woman's appearance.

History

Victorian Dress Reform Movement (1850s–1890s) 
As part of the first wave of feminism from the 1850s-1890s, the Victorian Dress Reform Movement aimed to put an end to the trend of women having to modify their bodies through use of corsets and tightlacing in order to fit the societal standard of tiny waistlines. A minority of women participated in this tradition of conformity, but often ended up facing ridicule whether or not they were successful at shrinking their waistline. The practice of tight-lacing proved to have many negative health risks, and was also extremely uncomfortable for women who partook. Women were mocked for their egotism if they were not able to shrink their waistline, and they were criticized for too small a waistline if they were successful. This instilled a feeling of defeat in women during these times, as nothing they did seemed to satisfy their male counterparts. As part of the Victorian Dress Reform Movement, women also fought for their right to dress in pants. Acceptance of all body types – regardless of waist measurements – was the major theme of the Victorian Dress Reform Movement, and this was the first movement of its kind.

First wave (1960s)
The origins of the body positivity movement date back to the Fat Acceptance movement of the 1960s. The idea of ending fat-shaming served as the seed of a larger project of accepting and celebrating all bodies and body types.

In 1967, New York radio host Steve Post held a "fat-in" in Central Park. He described the purpose of the event "was to protest discrimination against the fat." This moment is often cited as the beginning of the Fat Acceptance movement. Five Months after the "fat-in", Lew Louderback composed an essay entitled "More People Should be Fat!" as a result of him witnessing the discrimination his wife experienced as a result of her size. The piece initiated a new movement with goals of correcting fat-shaming, and the belief that being fat is always indicative of being unhealthy. The essay shed light on the discrimination fat people experience in America, and the culture surrounding fat-shaming. Louderback's contribution inspired the creation of the National Association to Advance Fat Acceptance (NAAFA) in 1969 by Bill Fabrey, with the mission of ending discrimination based on body weight.

Second wave (1990s) 

The second wave of body positivity prioritized providing people of all sizes a place where they could comfortably come together and exercise. There were programs being made specifically for overweight people, such as Making Waves. Home exercise programs like Genia Pauli Haddon and Linda DeMarco's home exercise video series Yoga For Round Bodies were also made for those who were not comfortable joining a wellness community. There were dangers in dieting that were found during the 90's. Dieting was found to be ineffective and causes more physical and psychological problems and does not actually solve anything. People sought help from dieting. They wanted to learn how to eat again. Chronic dieting had not proven to be effective. Dieting has been used as a ploy to get people's money and does not actually work, especially in the long term.

Third wave (2010s)
The current form of the body positivity movement arose around 2012 largely as a response to the increase in social media culture and advertisements. The rise of Instagram inspired a debate about cultural beauty standards, and the body positivity movement arose as a response and argument in favor of embracing all body types, loving one's body even with any flaws, and feeling confident about one's own body. Since 2012, there has been a heightened presence of the movement, although corporations have capitalized on the sentiments in order to sell products.

The movement challenged ideals including unblemished skin and slim "beach bodies." Model and feminist Tess Holliday founded '@EffYourBeautyStandards', which brought an outpour of support to the body positive movement. After founding the movement, the size-26 Holliday was signed to Milk Management, a large model agency in Europe, as their first model over size 20. Instagram has been utilized as an advertising platform for the movement since. Pioneers connect with brands and advertisers to promote the movement. In 2016, Mattel released a new line of Barbie dolls under the name Fashionistas with three different body shapes, seven skin colors, twenty-two eye colors and twenty-four hairstyles to be more inclusive. Body artists have also helped promote and spread education about body positivity in the United States and United Kingdom, producing a number of notable outdoor nude painting displays for plus sized men and women.

Psychology 
The body positivity movement aims to change societal and individual perceptions of weight, size, and appearance to be more accepting of all bodies regardless of their diverse characteristics. An individual's perception of their body can greatly influence their mental health and overall well-being, particularly in teenagers. Poor body image, also known as body dissatisfaction, has been linked to a range of physical and mental health problems including anorexia, bulimia, depression, body image disturbance, and body dysmorphic disorder. Partakers are encouraged to view self-acceptance and self-love as traits that dignify the person.

The movement advocates against determining self-worth based on physical appearance or perceptions of one's own beauty. In the field of psychology, this is referred to as appearance-contingent self-worth, and can be highly detrimental to an individual's mental health. The degree to which one feels proud of their physical appearance is referred to as appearance self-esteem. People who fall under the appearance-contingent self-worth umbrella put great effort into looking their best so that they feel their best. This is can be beneficial when an individual feels that they look good, but is extremely negative and anxiety-inducing when they do not. Body positivity can be improved by implementing more self-care behaviors which can include a healthy diet or exercise; research has shown that participating in more self-care activities can reduce the risk of eating disorders and improve mental health.

Inclusion 
The body positivity movement focuses largely on women, recognizing that women face more societal pressure to conform to beauty standards than men. Eating disorders are more common in women due to this social phenomenon. Nevertheless, men may face societal pressures to fit into a masculine physical ideal. Qualities that fit that mold are height, rectus abdominis muscle or "six pack abs", a broad upper body, muscular arms, shoulders, pectoral muscles, genital shape and size, etc. Men may face anxiety and pressure to shape their bodies to fit this mold and may struggle with body image disorders, including body dysmorphia, anorexia nervosa and bulimia nervosa. Eating disorders in men are less commonly diagnosed and therefore less publicized. Although there is an underdiagnosis of body dysmorphic disorder, the clinical symptoms can affect people of any gender. While body positivity has largely been discussed with regard to women, the body positivity movement may uplift people of all genders and sexes - as well as ages, races, ethnicities, sexual preferences, and religions.

Brand influence and social media 
Due to social media the notion "every body is beautiful" came into being. The movement for body positivity has played a role in influencing marketing campaigns for major corporations. In 2004, Dove launched their "Real Beauty" campaign, in which advertisements depicted women of varying body types and skin tones in a manner that portrayed acceptance and positivity towards their bodies. On their website, Dove presents its Dove Self-Esteem Project as a mission for "helping young people reach their full potential by delivering quality body confidence and self-esteem education". The company also partners with and raises money for eating disorder organizations.

In 2017, the American women's underwear company Aerie launched a campaign called "AerieReal", in which the company promised to not retouch or edit their models, encouraging body positivity and body-acceptance despite features such as cellulite, stretch marks, or fat rolls. Aerie has begun featuring body positive influencers in their photo shoots and advertising campaigns, as well as plus sized models. To accommodate the last, the brand has launched a plus size clothing line.

In 2019, Decathlon joined the efforts of other companies with their #LeggingsForEverybody campaign, stating their mission as "to boost body confidence and support you in your fitness journey".

Recently, paradigms on social media have been changing from pushing feminine beauty ideals to challenging those ideals through image related empowerment and inspiration. Several influencers such as AerieReal model Iskra Lawrence have been preaching body positivity, creating hashtags such as #IWokeUpLikeThis, #EffYourBeautyStandards, #HonorMyCurves, #CelebrateMySize, #GoldenConfidence, and #ImNoModelEither.

Social media plays a pivotal role in the body positivity movement, in part by providing education and exposure on different body types. Instagram and Facebook are some social platforms that, as of 2019, have body positive policies that cause advertisements for cosmetic surgery, weight loss supplements, and detox products, to be hidden from underaged demographics. In addition to promoting positive body image, these policies aim to curb the advertisement of supplements unregulated by the Food and Drug Administration (FDA). Social media platforms such as Instagram are frequently used to post body positivity content and fuel related discussion.

Although studies about social media and body image are still in their early stages, there seems to be a correlation between social media use and body image concerns. Body image tends to be positively or negatively affected by the content to which people are exposed on social media. The action of people uploading pictures of themselves appears to effectuate a negative body image.

Criticism

The body positivity movement has been criticized for encouraging lifestyle habits that negatively affect one's health. A central complaint is that excessive approval of overweight and obese individuals could dissuade them from desiring to improve their health, leading to lifestyle disease. Among health professionals, agreement with the movement is very low. A 2012 study found that among a sample of 1,130 trainee dietitians, nutritionist, nurses and medical doctors, only 1.4% had "positive or neutral attitudes" regarding excess body fat. According to internist Aditi G Jha, M.D., "central obesity is the number one factor associated with diabetes, hypertension, and infertility, in their respective orders." The body positivity movement is sometimes discussed as a "denial of science".

The movement has also faced criticism from feminists. Gender scholar Amber E. Kinser wrote that posting an unedited photo of your body to a social media website, which is an example of an action associated with the movement, does little to prevent women's worth from being directly correlated to their physical appearance.

With the majority of the body positivity movement recently occurring on Instagram, a recent study found that 40 percent of body positivity posts were centered around appearance. With Instagram being a photo-sharing social media site, the effort to place the focus less on appearance has been criticized to be contradictory.

An additional criticism is that the movement puts too much emphasis on the role of the individual to improve their own body image, and not enough attention on identifying and eliminating the cultural forces, messages, beliefs, and advertising campaigns accountable for causing widespread body dissatisfaction.

Another criticism of the body positivity movement is that it can impair one's agency and authenticity. Researcher Lisa Legault argues that an undue emphasis on body positivity can “stifle and diminish important negative feelings.” She explains that negative feelings are a natural part of the human experience and that such feelings can be important and informational. She says “ignoring negative feelings and experiences exerts a cost to authenticity and self-integration." The movement, Legault argues, cannot make it seem like a person should only feel positive emotions. This expectation to have only positive feelings is sometimes called “toxic body positivity.” Moreover, a failure to achieve a genuine, confident sense of body positivity could be construed as a weakness, and this is another problematic aspect of the body positivity movement.

See also
 Awoulaba
 Body shaming
 Duane Bryers
 Fat acceptance movement
 Fattitude - 2017 documentary
 Height discrimination
 Lookism
 Sex-positive movement
 Sizeism

Notes

References

Body image in popular culture
Fat acceptance movement